Christ Church in Taitā, Lower Hutt is the oldest surviving church in the Wellington region of New Zealand.

The church is built on land donated by Algernon Grey Tollemache. Sidney Hirst, a Yorkshire-born carpenter, constructed the building, completing it in late 1853.

In the 1950s, efforts to protect the church played a role in the establishment of the New Zealand Historic Places Trust.

An arsonist destroyed about a third of the interior of the building in 1989, but it has since been restored from photos and architectural drawings.

References

External links
Christ Church website 

Wellington
Buildings and structures in Lower Hutt
Gothic Revival church buildings in New Zealand
Carpenter Gothic church buildings
Heritage New Zealand Category 1 historic places in the Wellington Region
Religious buildings and structures in the Wellington Region
Listed churches in New Zealand
1850s architecture in New Zealand
Wooden churches in New Zealand